Gosforth is a village, civil parish and electoral ward in the Lake District, in the Borough of Copeland in Cumbria, England. Historically in Cumberland, it is situated on the A595 road between Whitehaven and Barrow-in-Furness. It had a population of 1,230 at the 2001 Census. At the 2011 census Gosforth was grouped with Ponsonby and Wasdale giving a total population of 1,396.

Adjacent settlements include Whitehaven, Egremont, Ravenglass and Wasdale. It is close to Wast Water, the deepest lake in England, and just a 7-minute drive from Seascale village and beach. The Cumbrian Coast railway can be accessed at Seascale.

Viking heritage
Gosforth contains a unique collection of Norse artefacts in and around St. Mary's Church. This includes the Gosforth cross, which is the tallest and oldest Viking cross in England. Another high cross was cut down in 1789 to make a sundial base, though the "fishing stone" panel from this survives in the church. There are also two large "hogback" tombs in the church.

Gosforth Hall
Work began on Gosforth Hall, now a hotel and restaurant near St. Mary's Church, in 1658, by a local gentleman called Robert Copley. The date of completion is not clear, although the date on the coat of arms situated in the bar is 1673. Copley had previously refused to pay the royal herald for his own coat of arms and instead, made one up himself. In his history of The Gosforth District, Dr. C.A. Parker states that Robert Copley in 1658 built "a large handsome house with orchards and gardens suitable", and Parker states that henceforth the house was named Gosforth Hall. With the hall being within the precinct of the church, it was likely that evidence of earlier occupation might be discovered. In 2005, the present owners of Gosforth Hall commissioned a small archaeological excavation within the grounds. This turned up some interesting finds indicating previous occupation on the site. This preliminary work was followed up in 2008 with an archaeological desk-based assessment and field evaluation.

Events
Gosforth is the base for two major athletic events each year, a ten-mile run and associated fun run in June, and a ten-kilometre race on the first Tuesday in September.

There is a thriving art scene in the village, and the Gosforth and District Arts Society (GADAS) holds weekly meetings as well as a very popular art exhibition every year, over the August bank holiday in the village hall.

Gallery

See also

Listed buildings in Gosforth, Cumbria

References

External links
  Cumbria County History Trust: Gosforth (nb: provisional research only - see Talk page)
Gosforth Parish Council website

 
Villages in Cumbria
Civil parishes in Cumbria
Borough of Copeland